Eumungerie is a town in central west New South Wales, Australia.

References

External links

Towns in New South Wales
Dubbo Regional Council